Blues For Pat: Live in San Francisco, is a live album by The Joshua Redman Quartet featuring Pat Metheny, Christian McBride and Billy Higgins, released in 1995 (JD 1282).

Background 
The music is composed by different composers mostly Redman, integrating elements of contemporary jazz.

Reception 
The AllMusic reviewer Scott Yanow awarded the album 4.5 stars, stating "After recording Wish for Warner Bros. in a quartet with guitarist Pat Metheny, bassist Charlie Haden and drummer Billy Higgins, young tenorman Joshua Redman hit the road with the same group (except with Christian McBride in Haden's place). This European CD, probably a bootleg, shows just how exciting the band was live. On 70 minutes of music recorded in a San Francisco club, Redman often indulges in close interplay and exciting tradeoffs with Metheny; the two clearly inspired each other. The recording quality is decent, and the performances overall actually exceed Wish in passion and creativity. Highlights include "Blues for Pat," an 18½-minute version of "St. Thomas" and "Carla's Groove." All Joshua Redman and Pat Metheny fans will want this one."

Track listing

Personnel
Joshua Redman – tenor saxophone
Pat Metheny – guitars
Christian McBride – upright bass
Billy Higgins – drums

Notes 
Photography by Manfred Rinderspacher
Recorded live in San Francisco 1994

References

External links
 

Joshua Redman albums
1995 live albums